BackTrack was a Linux distribution that focused on security, based on the Knoppix Linux distribution aimed at digital forensics and penetration testing use. In March 2013, the Offensive Security team rebuilt BackTrack around the Debian distribution and released it under the name Kali Linux.

History 
The BackTrack distribution originated from the merger of two formerly competing distributions which focused on penetration testing:
 WHAX: a Slax-based Linux distribution developed by Mati Aharoni, a security consultant. Earlier versions of WHAX were called Whoppix and were based on Knoppix.
 Auditor Security Collection: a Live CD based on Knoppix developed by Max Moser which included over 300 tools organized in a user-friendly hierarchy.

On January 9, 2010, BackTrack 4 improved hardware support, and added official FluxBox support. The overlap with Auditor and WHAX in purpose and in collection of tools partly led to the merger. The overlap was done based on Ubuntu Lucid LTS starting from BackTrack 5.

Tools 
BackTrack provided users with easy access to a comprehensive and large collection of security-related tools ranging from port scanners to Security Audit. Support for Live CD and Live USB functionality allowed users to boot BackTrack directly from portable media without requiring installation, though permanent installation to hard disk and network was also an option.

BackTrack included many well known security tools including:
 Metasploit for integration
 Wi-Fi drivers supporting monitor mode (rfmon mode) and packet injection
 Aircrack-ng
 Reaver, a tool used to exploit a vulnerability in WPS
 Gerix Wifi Cracker
 Kismet
 Nmap
 Ophcrack
 Ettercap
 Wireshark (formerly known as Ethereal)
 BeEF (Browser Exploitation Framework)
 Hydra
 OWASP Mantra Security Framework, a collection of hacking tools, add-ons and scripts based on Firefox
 Cisco OCS Mass Scanner, a very reliable and fast scanner for Cisco routers to test default telnet and enabling password.
 A large collection of exploits as well as more commonplace software such as browsers.
 Armitage - java frontend to Metasploit.

BackTrack arranged tools into 12 categories:
 Information gathering
 Vulnerability assessment
 Exploitation tools
 Privilege escalation
 Maintaining access
 Reverse engineering
 RFID tools
 Stress testing
 Forensics
 Reporting tools
 Services
 Miscellaneous

Releases 

Whenever a new version of BackTrack was released, older versions would lose their support and service from the BackTrack development team. There are currently no supported versions of BackTrack.

References

External links 
 
 Offensive Security
 SecurityNet on BackTrack

Discontinued Linux distributions
KDE
Operating system distributions bootable from read-only media
Pentesting software toolkits
Year of introduction missing 
Linux distributions